Nicole Tung (born 1986) is a Hong Kong-born photojournalist. Tung is known for her coverage of conflicts and events, including the Syrian Civil War, the European refugee crisis and the Arab Spring.

Tung studied at New York University, receiving a degree in journalism and history in 2009.

Her work is included in the collection of the Museum of Fine Arts Houston.

Career
As of March 2022, Tung is covering the 2022 war in Ukraine.

References

External links
Official site

Living people
1986 births
Chinese photographers